Tarchit is a village in the Leh district of the Indian union territory of Ladakh. It is located in the Nyoma tehsil.

Demographics
According to the 2011 census of India, Tarchit has 32 households. The effective literacy rate (i.e. the literacy rate of population excluding children aged 6 and below) is 62%.

References 

Villages in Nyoma tehsil